Cedar Boys is an edgy and tense Australian film about the life of 3 young adults in Western Sydney, New South Wales, Australia. Written, directed and co-produced by Serhat Caradee and produced by Matthew Dabner, Ranko Markovic, and Jeff Purser, Cedar Boys had its world premiere at the 2009 Sydney Film Festival. It opened in theatres on 30 July 2009 and was made available on DVD on 7 December 2009. The film has a dedication at the end to Caradee's mother, who died of cancer 19 days after the film was completed.

The film won the Audience Award during the 56th 2009 Sydney Film Festival and was nominated for "Best Film" category at the 2009 Inside Film Awards. It was an official selection in many festivals, including Vancouver, Chicago, Antalya, Dubai Film Festival, and the 2010 London Australian Film Festival.

Plot
Tarek a young working class man living in Sydney's tough western suburbs, wants to help his imprisoned older brother, Jamal but cannot afford the costs. His mate Nabil, a cleaner, persuades Tarek to steal drugs from a drugs depot, and their drug-dealing friend Sam helps in distribution. Meanwhile, Tarek has met Amie, an Anglo-Australian young woman who likes to party and to snort cocaine.

Cast
 Rachael Taylor as Amie 
 Martin Henderson as Mathew
 Les Chantery as Tarek
Daniel Amalm as Cassar
 Serhat Caradee as Zac
 Bren Foster as Jamal 
 Waddah Sari as Sam 
 Buddy Dannoun as Nabil 
 Matuse Terror as Hamdi
 Ian Roberts as Bell Room Door Man 
 Drew Pearson as Camera News Man 
 Erica Lovell as Brigid
 Fayssal Bazzi as Assad 
 Hani Malik as Walid 
 Taffy Hany as Yousaf Ayoub
 Yasser Assadi as Ali 
 Vico Thai as Police Officer 
 Jake Wall as Simon 
 Dan Mor as Danny 
 Hunter McMahon as Craig 
 Jayb Hoyt as Brian 
 Eddie Idik as Bell Room Doorman 2 
 Helen Chebatte as Huda

Film festivals
 Sydney Film Festival 2009
 Chicago International Film Festival 2009
 Vancouver International Film Festival 2009
 Dubai International Film Festival 2009
 Antalya Golden Orange Film Festival 2009
 London Australian Film Festival 2010

Accolades
 Sydney Film Festival Audience Award - Serhat Caradee - Won
 Australian Directors Guild, Best Direction - Serhat Caradee - Nominated
 Australian Film Institute (AFI) Awards, Best Original Screenplay - Serhat Caradee - Nominated 
 Australian Writers Guild (AWGIE) - Serhat Caradee - Nominated
 Inside Film Awards, Best Film - Serhat Caradee - Nominated

Production 
Cedar Boys cost $1.3M to make.

Reception and box office 
The film received mixed reviews from critics. It grossed $354,160 at the box office in Australia, but did extremely well on the DVD for Sony Home Entertainment, Apple iTunes, and VOD markets. It has a cult following in the suburbs of Sydney, Melbourne and Brisbane due to its "outsiders" subject matter and multiple screening on Australian television and cable via Showtime and Movie Classics channel.

See also
Cinema of Australia

References

External links
 
 
  Serhat Caradee IMDb
  Bonafide Pictures

2009 films
Australian drama films
Films set in Sydney
Films shot in Sydney
2009 directorial debut films
2000s English-language films